Chen Luyun (7 June 1977 – 23 December 2015) was a Chinese basketball player who competed in the 2004 Summer Olympics.

References

1977 births
2015 deaths
Basketball players from Fujian
Olympic basketball players of China
Basketball players at the 2004 Summer Olympics
People from Xiamen
Chinese women's basketball players
Asian Games medalists in basketball
Basketball players at the 2002 Asian Games
Deaths from cancer in the People's Republic of China
Centers (basketball)
Asian Games gold medalists for China
Medalists at the 2002 Asian Games
Deaths from colorectal cancer
21st-century Chinese women